Antal Ruprecht (1748–1818) was a Hungarian Chemist.

He was born in Szomolnok, Hungary in 1748. He graduated from the Mining Academy of Selmecbánya where he later became a professor of chemistry and metallurgy in 1779. He was the first to melt platinum and contributed to the discovery of tellurium in 1784. Ruprecht was the first to theorise that alkaline earth metals were compounds rather than elements; later proved by Humphry Davy. This theory caused some controversy in the chemistry community due to the previous assumption of earths being fundamental substances.

References

Hungarian chemists
1748 births
1818 deaths
People from Gelnica District